Alexy is a surname. Notable people with the surname include:

 A.J. Alexy (born 1998), American baseball player
 Gillian Alexy (born 1986), Australian actress
 Janko Alexy (1894–1970), Slovakian painter, writer, and publicist
 Robert Alexy (born 1945), German jurist and philosopher

See also
 Aleksis
 Aleksy
 Alexey
 Alexie
 Alexis (disambiguation)